Lanwa FC, officially Dongguan Lanwa Football Club was a Chinese professional association football club located in Dongguan, China. The club was founded in 1999 and played in the Chinese and Hong Kong football systems.

History
Lanwa was founded in 1999 as Gansu Tianma, and originally played in the Chinese football system. Following its relegation from the Yi League (Chinese Third Division), it was bought by Dongguan Dongcheng company who renamed the club and moved the club to the Hong Kong football system pyramid.

Name changes
1999–2001: Gansu Tianma SC
2001: Lanzhou Huanghe F.C
2002: Gansu Nongken FC()
2003: Ningbo Yaoma FC
2004–2005: Dongguan Dongcheng FC
2005–2009: Lanwa FC (Dongguan Lanwa FC)

Recent seasons
{|class="wikitable"
|-bgcolor="#efefef"
! Season
!
! Pos.
! Pl.
! W
! D
! L
! GS
! GA
! P
!Senior Shield
!League Cup
!FA Cup
!colspan=2|Asia
!Notes
|-
|2005–06
|1D
|align=right|5
|align=right|14||align=right|4||align=right|5||align=right|5
|align=right|14||align=right|20||align=right|17
|bgcolor=#CC9966|semi-final
||group stage
||first round
|||||
|-
|2006–07
|1D
|align=right|5
|align=right|18||align=right|8||align=right|2||align=right|8
|align=right|37||align=right|26||align=right|26
|bgcolor=#CC9966|semi-final
||group stage
||first round
|||||
|-
|2007–08
|1D
|align=right| 
|align=right| ||align=right| ||align=right| ||align=right|
|align=right| ||align=right| ||align=right| 
||quarter-final
||group stage
|||||||
|}

See also
List of association football clubs playing in the league of another country
Gansu

References

External links
 Lanwafc.com Official website
Lanwa FC at HKFA.com

Football clubs in China
Football clubs in Hong Kong
1999 establishments in China
2009 disestablishments in China
Defunct football clubs in China